Danimal may refer to:

People
Danimal Cannon, the stage name of musician Daniel Behrens (born 1983)
Danimal, a nickname of defensive lineman Dan Hampton (born 1957)
DanimaL, the stage name of rapper Daniel Williams-Hashemi (born 1994)

Other uses
Danimals, an American brand of yogurt